Weisthümer is a collection  of partially oral legal traditions from rural German-speaking Europe
by Jacob Grimm, published in four volumes (1840–1863), intended for use in research into Germanic law.

The German term Weisthum (post-1901 spelling Weistum) in the sense of "historical legal text" originates in the region of the middle Rhine and the Moselle. In southern Germany, equivalent terms were Ehaft or Ehafttaiding, in the Alsace Dinghofrodel, in Switzerland Offnung, in Austria Banntaiding, and in Low German Willkür or Beliebung. Rural oral legal traditions are found primarily in the Alamannic and Austro-Bavarian regions of German-speaking Europe. According to the more recent research, Weistum texts are to be addressed as «a standardized artefact intended for a circumscribed circle of legitimate or addressed recipients, namely the "dominion" and the peasant landed gentry/court inmates.»

See also
Germanic law
Landrecht (medieval)
Landsgemeinde
Lögsögumaður
Medieval Scandinavian law
Vehmic court

References

Dieter Werkmüller.  Über Aufkommen und Verbreitung der Weistümer: nach der Sammlung von Jacob Grimm (1972).
Jacob Grimm (ed.).  Weisthümer. 6 vols. (1840–1863), index volume ed. Richard Schröder (1878); reprinted Darmstadt 1957.

1863 non-fiction books
Germanic philology
Early Germanic law
Germanic studies
Legal history of the Holy Roman Empire